Idanpramine is a drug used for functional gastrointestinal disorders.  It acts as an antimuscarinic agent.

References

Hydantoins
1-Piperidinyl compounds
Phenol ethers